Pando Health  is a healthcare data platform created by Forward Clinical Ltd and named after the Pando (tree).

History
Pando was founded in 2017 by Dr Barney Gilbert, Lydia Yarlott and Philip Mundy with a vision of connecting healthcare for everyone. The company has raised approximately $10m USD in venture capital financing, including from Australian investment firm Skip Capital  to allow international expansion in India and Australia.

Pando's core platform empowers healthcare professionals to collaborate and make expert decisions together. Usage during the COVID-19 pandemic in the United Kingdom increased very substantially, with more than 2 million clinical messages processed per week in 2020.

It is approved by the NHS Clinical Communication Procurement Framework.  In July 2021 there was a security breach which saw NHS patients’ photos automatically uploaded onto users’ smartphones.

References

Application software
Software companies based in London